Comet Machholz, formally designated C/2004 Q2, is a long-period comet discovered by Donald Machholz on August 27, 2004. It reached naked eye brightness in January 2005. Unusual for such a relatively bright comet, its perihelion was farther from the Sun than the Earth's orbit.

Period 

Given the orbital eccentricity of this object, different epochs can generate quite different heliocentric unperturbed two-body best-fit solutions to the aphelion distance (maximum distance) of this object.  For objects at such high eccentricity, the Suns barycentric coordinates are more stable than heliocentric coordinates. Using JPL Horizons the barycentric orbital elements for epoch 2050 generate a semi-major axis of 537 AU and a period of approximately 12,400 years.

There are six other long-period comets named Machholz: C/1978 R3 (a.k.a. 1978 XIII, 1978l), C/1985 K1 (a.k.a. 1985 VIII, 1985e), C/1988 P1 (a.k.a. 1988 XV, 1988j), C/1992 N1 (a.k.a. 1992 XVII, 1992k), C/1994 T1 (a.k.a. 1994 XXVII, 1994r), and C/2010 F4. In addition, there are C/1992 F1 (Tanaka-Machholz), C/1994 N1 (Nakamura-Nishimura-Machholz) and C/2018 V1 (Machholz-Fujikawa-Iwamoto).

See also 
 96P/Machholz
 141P/Machholz and fragments

References

External links 
 Sky and Telescope — Comet Machholz in the Evening Sky
 Sky and Telescope — Catch Comet Machholz at Its Best
 The Discovery of Comet Machholz (discoverer's personal retelling)
 Gallery of images
 
 

Non-periodic comets
20040827